Cold Turkey (also titled Pasadena) is a 2013 American comedy-drama film written and directed by Will Slocombe and starring Peter Bogdanovich, Ashton Holmes, Alicia Witt, Sonya Walger, Wilson Bethel and Cheryl Hines.

Cast
Peter Bogdanovich
Sonya Walger
Cheryl Hines
Alicia Witt
Ashton Holmes
Wilson Bethel
Amy Ferguson
Victoria Tennant
Nicolas Coster
Jet Jurgensmeyer
Ross Partridge
Azar Beaudoin

Reception
The film has a 20% rating on Rotten Tomatoes.  Veronika Ferdman of Slant Magazine awarded the film one and a half stars out of four.  Bill Goodykoontz of The Arizona Republic awarded the film two and a half stars.  Noel Murray of The Dissolve awarded the film two stars out of five.

David Edelstein of Vulture.com gave the film a positive review, calling it "a simmering piece of holiday dystopia with a good, scorching boil-over."

References

External links
 
 

American comedy-drama films
2013 comedy-drama films
2013 films
2010s English-language films
2010s American films